The Institute for Veterans and Military Families (IVMF) is an interdisciplinary research institution that informs and advances the policy, economic and wellness concerns of the America’s veterans and families. It is housed in the National Veterans Resource Center at Syracuse University. The IVMF annually serves thousands of U.S. veterans, service members, and their families around the world and as of 2019, the Institute had served 100,000 military service members, veterans, and their families through their programs.

History

IVMF was launched in June 2011 by J. Michael Haynie and then chancellor Nancy Cantor to bring together several pre-existing veterans related institutes at the University. The institute traces its beginning to The Entrepreneurship Bootcamp for Veterans with Disabilities (EBV) which started within the Martin J. Whitman School of Management in 2006-2007. Under the leadership of Steven Barnes, IVMF grew from four employees in 2006 to more than 70 team members across eight states in 2018.

Programs
The IVMF is the first interdisciplinary academic institute committed to advocacy, research, and assistance for military veterans and their families.

The IVMF provides programs in career, vocational and entrepreneurship education and training, providing service members, veterans and their families with the skills needed to be successful in education, work and life. The IVMF also coordinates comprehensive collective impact strategies; and works with communities and nonprofits to enhance service delivery for veterans and their families.

The IVMF has designed a free, comprehensive career training, certification and employment program called Onward to Opportunity in conjunction with the Veterans Career Transition Program (O2O). This program is designed to launch veterans into their next career with more than 30 industry-recognized career tracks and courses.

AmericaServes is a national initiative of IVMF that serves 18 communities all over the United States. Their services include  employment assistance, assistance with VA benefits, education, transportation, mental/behavioral health resources and housing.

The V-WISE programs bring female veterans and spouses/partners of veteran business owners together for a conference focused on entrepreneurial training and support.

In early April 2017 The IVMF and the United States Department of Veterans Affairs' Center for Innovation (VACI) launched a national pilot project aimed at demonstrating the merits of a community-based health care and services coordinated referral system within the Institute’s AmericaServes initiative.

By 2019, the Institute had served 100,000 military service members, veterans, and their families through their programs. In 2020, Syracuse University Graduated Over 200 Military-Connected Students.

Publications
The IVMF routinely publishes publications and research reports on veteran related issues. It also conducts surveys in collaboration with Military times. IVMF researchers have been called to testify before US Senate and House committees on Veterans Affairs.

The IVMF uses the SAS Analytics software to analyze vast amounts of data on veterans, career opportunities, communities and non-profits. It also trains veterans in analytics fields.

The IVMF was featured on 60 Minutes in 2013.

National Veterans Resource Center
The IVMF is housed in the National Veterans Resource Center at the Daniel & Gayle D’Aniello building. The building was designed by SHoP Architects in 2016, and the construction finished in spring 2020. The $64 million facility was funded entirely with philanthropic gifts. A $20 million gift was announced in 2018 by SU trustee Daniel D’Aniello, '68, and his wife Gayle to support the construction of the National Veterans Resource Center (NVRC).
The IVMF received $14.5 million from the Upstate Revitalization Initiative.

The four-story, 126,000-square-foot complex has space for a variety of veteran-related organizations and houses a 750-seat auditorium, a cafe, a gallery, a research center, and a banquet hall that turns into a lounge/study area. The facility serves Regional Student Veteran Resource Center, the U.S. Department of Veterans Affairs "Vet-Success on Campus", the National Center of Excellence for Veteran Business Ownership, Veteran Business Outreach Center and Accelerator, and Syracuse University’s Office of Veteran and Military Affairs, and offices for the Army and Air Force ROTC.

Leadership and staff
J. Michael Haynie is the founder and Executive Director of the IVMF. He also serves as vice Chancellor for Strategic Initiatives and Innovation at Syracuse University. The IVMF advisory board includes researchers and leaders in policy, military, higher education, and veterans’ affairs fields.

In 2018, the Institute had a staff of 70 team members across eight states.

Funding
, JPMorgan Chase, the founding partner of the institute, has contributed $34 million to the institute since its founding. Corporate sponsors include Lockheed Martin, SAS Institute, Prudential Financial, Walmart Foundation, Accenture, and others. In 2019, the IVMF accounted for 30 percent of the externally sponsored research funding generated by Syracuse University.

References

External links 

Veterans and Military Families
United States military support organizations
American veterans' organizations
2011 establishments in New York (state)
Educational institutions established in 2011